KJLU (88.9 FM) is a radio station broadcasting a smooth jazz format. Licensed to Jefferson City, Missouri, United States, the station is owned by Lincoln University of Missouri.

See also
 List of jazz radio stations in the United States

External links

JLU
Lincoln University (Missouri)
Jazz radio stations in the United States
Radio stations established in 1973
1973 establishments in Missouri